Trachylepis binotata, the Ovambo tree skink or Bocage's mabuya, is a species of skink from Namibia and Angola.

Trachylepis
Reptiles of Namibia
Reptiles described in 1867
Taxa named by José Vicente Barbosa du Bocage